BFC is a handball club from Beek, Limburg. The club was founded in 1998 by a merger of HV Blauw-Wit from Neerbeek and HV Caesar from Beek.

Since its foundation in 1998, neither the men's nor the woman's team won the championship or the national cup. The women's team was able to reach the finals of the national cup in 2006 but lost to Quintus. Because the team reached the finals of the national cup, they were allowed to enter the EHF Cup Winners' Cup, but were knocked out of the tournament after the first round.

In 2008, BFC co-operated with V&L and HV Sittardia to form a stronger men's team. The project was called Tophandbal Zuid-Limburg and two new teams were formed: Limburg Lions and Limburg Wild Dogs (later turned into the second team of Limburg Lions). In 2016, the management of BFC decided to take no longer part in the collaboration.

Accomplishments

Woman
Dutch Handball Cup: 
Runner-Up (1) : 2006

European record

Former players 
 Lambert Schuurs (2001-2006)
 Iso Sluijters (2007-2008)
 Larissa Nusser (until 2014)

References

External links
 Official website

Dutch handball clubs
1998 establishments in the Netherlands
Handball clubs established in 1998
Beek